A. norvegica may refer to:
 Acantholycosa norvegica, a wolf spider species 
 Arenaria norvegica, the Norwegian sandwort, a plant species
 Artemisia norvegica, the alpine sagewort, a flowering plant species